Mary Désirée Anderson (1902–1973) was a British specialist in Christian iconography and early Church drama, as well as a leading expert on English medieval woodcarving and a poet. Photographs contributed by Maisie Anderson to the Conway Library are currently being digitised by the Courtauld Institute of Art, as part of the Courtauld Connects project. She published under the name M. D. Anderson.

Personal life 
Anderson married Sir George Trenchard Cox (1905–1995) in 1935, a fellow art historian, and museum director (Birmingham Museum and Art Gallery and the V&A). Her parents were British physiologist and academic Hugh Kerr Anderson (1865–1928) and Jessie Mina Innes (d. 1946). Anderson died in 1973.

Archive 
Her memoirs, diaries (1918–1933), sketchbook, letters, poems and pamphlets, are held at Gonville and Caius College Archive, Cambridge, having been donated by her husband, Sir George Trenchard Cox. Her reminiscences of life at Cambridge feature in A History of the University of Cambridge: Volume 4 (1870–1990), edited by Christopher Brooke, Christopher N. L. Brooke, Damian Riehl Leader, Victor Morgan, and Peter Searb.

Selected works

Academic writing 
The Medieval Carver,1935, Cambridge U. P.
Animal Carvings in British Churches, 1938, Cambridge U. P.
Design for a journey, 1940, Cambridge U. P.
British Women at War, 1941, John Murray; Pilot Press
Looking for history in British Churches, 1951, John Murray
Choir Stalls of Lincoln Minster, 1951, Friends of Lincoln Cathedral
Misericords. Medieval life in English woodcarving. 1954, Harmondsworth: Penguin Books
The Imagery of British Churches, 1955, John Murray
Drama and Imagery in English Medieval Churches, 1963, Cambridge U.P.
Grey Sisters, 1972, Chatto and Windus
A saint at stake: the strange death of William of Norwich 1144, 1964, Faber
History by the Highway, 1967, Faber & Faber, 1967
The Changeling Niobid, 1969, Chatto & Windus
History and imagery in British churches, 1971, J. Murray

Poetry 

 Bow Bells are Silent [poems], 1943, Williams & Norgate
 Her poem 'The Black-Out' published in Peace and War: A Collection of Poems, edited by Michael Harrison, Christopher Stuart-Clark (1989), p. 97
 Her poem 'The Time of Dunkirk' in Shadows of War, British Women's Poetry of the Second World War, ed. Anne Powell (Sutton Publishing, 1999), p. 41

References 

1902 births
1973 deaths
20th-century British women writers
British medievalists
British art historians
Women art historians
20th-century British historians
Women diarists
British diarists
British historians of religion
20th-century British poets
British women poets
20th-century diarists